Toni Foulkes is the former alderman of Chicago's 16th ward, and was formerly the alderman for the 15th ward. She is African American.

Aldermanic career
In 2007, Foulkes was elected Chicago alderman for the 15th Ward, winning an open-race to succeed outgoing alderman Theodore Thomas. She was reelected in 2011.

She was redistricted to the 16th Ward, where she won election in 2015. The race saw her running against incumbent 16th Ward alderman JoAnn Thompson, in addition to several other contenders. However, Thompson died two weeks before the initial round of voting in the election. Ultimately, the election saw her win a runoff election against Stephanie Coleman.

In 2019, Foulkes was unseated by Stephanie Coleman, who she had narrowly defeated in the previous election.

In 2014, she supported a bill to require employers to provide paid for sick leave for all Chicago workers.

References

Living people
Chicago City Council members
Women city councillors in Illinois
21st-century American politicians
21st-century American women politicians
Year of birth missing (living people)
African-American women in politics
African-American city council members in Illinois
21st-century African-American women
21st-century African-American politicians